IMST (Institute for Mobile and Satellite Communication Technology) is an independent research organization non-university located in North Rhine-Westphalia. It has been formed as a private-owned company with limited liability GmbH, similar to Ltd.), it was founded in 1992.

Research Institute IMST 
IMST is an associated research organization for Mobile and Satellite Communication Technology to the university of Duisburg-Essen, Germany. This connection enables a direct link to leading edge science and technology research. The main objective of the company's establishment at the Lower-Rhine area (west of the Rhine-Ruhr industrial zone) was the transfer of scientific and applied research knowledge to the industry, while being a competent partner and companion along the value chain for the industry, mainly in telecommunications.

IMST is an independent organization and acts as a commercial organization. From its own self-image IMST sees itself  as a technology-oriented development house for radio systems and microelectronics, with emphasis on contract research and licensing of technology. IMST is heavily involved in the research programs of the European Union as well.

Activity main focuses 
IMST.Research: Applied research for radio communications, radar systems, microsystems and nanoelectronics.

IMST.Development: Contract-based industrial design and development, from microelectronics to product realizations in software and hardware.

IMST.Products: EDA-Electronic Design Automation Software: Empire - A full 3D electromagnetic simulation tool, wireless solutions and radio modules.

IMST.Testing: Accredited test center for general Type Approval, mobile terminals, antennas and RF circuits.

Research Objectives 
All areas and applications where wireless technology in some form plays a role, in particular telecommunications and IT, automation, automotive and medical is IMST active. Within the regional research framework of the NRW-country "automotive.nrw", co-financed with funds from the European EFRE-programme (European Framework for Regional Development), IMST has been awarded to build a center for automotive technology ("Das KAT").

Competence and Experience 
IMST was funded by the European Regional Development Fund on September 11, 1992 by the two founders Ingo Wolff and Peter Waldow. Since early 1993, the research activities are in full operation. Priorities are (radio-)communication systems, circuit and antenna technology. Furthermore, an accredited test center facility is related to issues of electromagnetic compatibility (EMC) and research on human safety aspects in electromagnetics.  IMST employs approximately 145 highly skilled people, mostly engineers and scientists. Universities and Colleges of the Lower-Rhine region cooperate with IMST GmbH in form of master, diploma and PhD-theses.

Quality Management System 
All research is subject to  a quality management system according to DIN EN ISO 9001:2008. The testing laboratories are certified and accredited according to DIN EN ISO / IEC 17025.

External links 
Homepage of Instituts
Homepage of EMPIRE XCcel, one of the leading 3D EM field solvers for antennas and passive RF devices
Homepage of automotive technology
Homepage of wireless modules

Research institutes in Germany
German companies established in 1992
Research institutes established in 1992
Telecommunication education
University of Duisburg-Essen
Buildings and structures in Wesel (district)